Ebussuud Efendi (30 December 1490 – 23 August 1574) was a Hanafi Maturidi Ottoman jurist and Qur'an exegete, who served as the Qadi (judge) of Istanbul from 1533 to 1537, and the Shaykh al-Islām of the Ottoman Empire from 1545 to 1574. He was also called "El-İmâdî" because his family was from Imâd, a village near Iskilip.

Ebussuud was the son of Iskilipli Sheikh Muhiddin Muhammad Efendi. In the 1530s, Ebussuud served as judge in Bursa, Istanbul and Rumelia, where he brought local laws into conformity with Islamic divine law (sharia). Sultan Suleiman the Magnificent promoted him to Shaykh al-Islām – supreme judge and highest official – in 1545, an office Ebussuud held until his death and which he brought to the peak of its power. He worked closely with the Sultan, issuing judicial opinions that legitimised Suleiman's killings of Yazidis and his successor Selim's attack on Cyprus. Ebussuud also issued legal rulings (fatwās) which labeled the Qizilbash, regardless of whether they lived on Iranian or Ottoman soil, as "heretics", and declared that killing them would be viewed as praiseworthy, other than just being allowed according to law.

Together with Suleiman, the "Lawgiver", Ebussuud reorganized Ottoman jurisprudence and brought it under tighter governmental control, creating a legal framework joining sharia and the Ottoman administrative code (qānūn). While the previously prevailing opinion held that judges were free to interpret sharia, the law that even the ruler was subject to, Ebussuud instituted a framework in which the judicial power was derived from the Sultan and which compelled judges to follow the Sultan's qānūn-nāmes, "law-letters", in their application of the law.

In addition to his judicial reforms, Ebussuud is also remembered for the great variety of fatwās he issued. His opinions allowing Karagöz plays and the consumption of coffee, a novelty at the time, are particularly celebrated. He is also known for a widely-contested fatwā permitting monetary dealings involving riba (interest) in certain situations. This opinion is often referenced by contemporary Muslim modernists.

Footnotes

References

Further reading
 
 

1490 births
1574 deaths
Hanafis
Maturidis
Political people from the Ottoman Empire
Sheikh-ul-Islams of the Ottoman Empire
Quranic exegesis scholars
Grand Muftis of Istanbul (Ottoman)
16th-century Muslim scholars of Islam
Jurists from the Ottoman Empire
16th-century jurists
People from İskilip
Islamic scholars from the Ottoman Empire
Shaykh al-Islāms